Raheny GAA (Irish: CLG Rath Éanna ), founded 1958, is a Gaelic Athletic Association club based in Raheny, Dublin.

History

The club was established in 1958, and was at first one of two clubs in the area, though the other, St Vincent's, with grounds at The Oval in central Raheny, served a different catchment.

Raheny were the 2007 Dublin Intermediate Hurling Championship after they defeated Ballyboden St Endas by 0–16 to 0–12 at O'Toole Park. Raheny last won the intermediate championship in 1970. Raheny won promotion to Dublin AFL Division 1 from Dublin AFL Division 2 in 2007 for the 2008 season.

Roll of Honour
 Dublin Senior Football Championship: Runners-Up 1970
 Dublin Intermediate Football Championship: Winners 1997
 Dublin Junior C Football Championship Winner 2014
 Dublin Under 21 Football Championship: Winners 1972
 Dublin Minor Football Championship: Winners 1972, 1973
 Dublin Minor C Football Championship Winners 2013, 2018
 Dublin Senior Football League Division 2 Winners 2007
 Dublin AFL Div. 5 Winners 2012
 Dublin Senior B Hurling Championship: Winners 2017
 Dublin Senior B Football Championship:  Runners-Up 2017
 Dublin Intermediate Hurling Championship: Winners 1990, 2007
 Dublin Junior Hurling Championship: Winners 1969, 2004
 Dublin Junior D Hurling Championship Winner 2012

Notable players

Club football players
Dublin senior men's SFC inter-county footballers
 Brian Fenton
 Brian Howard
 Seán MacMahon
 Paddy Gogarty
 David Henry 
 David Hickey
 Alan Larkin
 Ciarán Whelan

Ladies footballers
 Siobhán Killeen – Republic of Ireland women's international footballer

References

External links
Official Raheny GAA Website
Dublin Club GAA

Raheny
 
Gaelic games clubs in Dublin (city)
Gaelic football clubs in Dublin (city)
Hurling clubs in Dublin (city)
Camogie clubs in County Dublin